The Copa del Generalísimo 1971 Final was the 69th final of the King's Cup. The final was played at Santiago Bernabéu Stadium in Madrid, on 4 July 1971, being won by FC Barcelona, who beat Valencia 4-3 in the extra-time.

Details

References

1971
Copa
FC Barcelona matches
Valencia CF matches